All 4 Nothing is the second studio album by American singer-songwriter Lauv. It was released on August 5, 2022, by A5B, Inc through Virgin Music Label & Artist Services. It is the follow up to his debut studio album, How I'm Feeling (2020). The album was supported by the release of four singles: "26", "All 4 Nothing (I'm So In Love)", "Kids Are Born Stars" and "Stranger". The album was released to positive reviews from music critics.

Background
In January 2022, Lauv posted a video to his social media pages to indicate his second album was complete, with the first single, "26", being released on January 28. In an interview with Rolling Stone, Lauv stated: "[I was] rethinking a lot of things in my life, finding balance, and revisiting childhood and my innate light. I felt like I had lost touch with it before, so thank God for therapy and meditation and the fact that I was able to make this album."

Track listing

Charts

Release history

References

2022 albums
Lauv albums